The 2014 Little League World Series, held in South Williamsport, Pennsylvania, started on August 14 and ended on August 24, 2014. Eight teams from the United States, and eight from the rest of the world, competed in the 68th edition of the tournament. This was the first World Series to feature entire rosters of players born in the 21st century. ESPN again broadcast the games. This also marked the 75th anniversary of Little League Baseball. All games took place at Howard J. Lamade Stadium and Little League Volunteer Stadium. Seoul Little League of Seoul, South Korea, defeated Jackie Robinson West Little League of Chicago, Illinois, 8–4 to win the championship. On February 11, 2015, Jackie Robinson West's wins were forfeited after it was found that the team used ineligible players from outside the Chicago area. Therefore, all of Jackie Robinson West's results are now officially recorded as 0–7 losses (forfeit). Mountain Ridge Little League of Las Vegas, Nevada, was named the U.S. champion due to the forfeiture of Jackie Robinson West's wins.

Teams

Team rosters

Notable players

 Robert Hassell – South Nashville Little League (Nashville, Tennessee); first-round selection, 2020 MLB draft, San Diego Padres
 Ed Howard – Jackie Robinson Little League (Chicago, Illinois); first-round selection, 2020 MLB draft, Chicago Cubs

Results 

The draw to determine the opening round pairings took place on June 11, 2014.

Jackie Robinson West Little League subsequently forfeited all wins, including the U.S. Championship. Any of their wins are recorded in the below brackets as a 6–0 loss. The scores of their games, as played during the tournament, were as follows:

United States bracket

International bracket

Crossover games
Teams that lose their first two games get to play a crossover game against a team from the other side of the bracket that also lost its first two games. These games are labeled Game A and Game B. Their purpose is to provide the teams who are already eliminated with the opportunity to play a third game.

Consolation game
The consolation game is played between the loser of the United States championship and the loser of the International championship.

World Championship

Mo'ne Davis
Philadelphia pitcher Mo'ne Davis was the first American female to participate in the Little League World Series (LLWS) since 2004 and the first female to pitch a winning LLWS game. The 13-year-old Davis became the first Little Leaguer featured on the cover of Sports Illustrated, as well as one of the youngest athletes to appear on the cover.

Jackie Robinson West

Team Jackie Robinson West was the first all black team to compete in the tournament in several decades.  Hailing from the Washington Heights area of Chicago, the team made it all the way to the World Championship before ultimately falling to a team from South Korea.

As the team rose to prominence, Evergreen Park, Illinois, Little League official Chris Janes began to investigate personal information pertaining to players of the Jackie Robinson West team, finding that multiple players on the team lived outside the team's designated boundary region. He later discovered that the team had used a falsified boundary map which covered a wider area than other teams in the region had agreed to. On February 11, 2015, based on Chris Janes' findings, the team's wins and U.S. titles were forfeited for its use of ineligible players. The U.S. title was retroactively awarded to Mountain Ridge Little League of Las Vegas. The Great Lakes title was also stripped from Jackie Robinson West, and given to the team they beat in the championship, New Albany, Indiana.

Legal action
In February 2016, parents of the team's members sued Little League Baseball, Janes, ESPN Inc., and ESPN personality Stephen A. Smith. They alleged that Little League Baseball and JRW officials had deliberately obfuscated details about the players' eligibility to "reap the benefits of notoriety and media attention", did not grant due process, that ESPN's Stephen A. Smith made defamatory remarks on its program First Take that "directly accused the JRW parents of perpetrating a fraud against the Little League", and that Janes had violated their right to privacy by using license plates to identify the players' residencies. A judge ruled that Smith's comments were a personal opinion protected by the Constitution, and removed both ESPN and Smith from the lawsuit in June 2017. In April 2021, all claims against the team’s volunteer coaches, who had been sued for fraud by Little League for their alleged roles in the eligibility scheme, were dismissed after the coaches filed a motion for summary judgment. A separate suit, brought by the players against Little League Baseball, Inc., Jackie Robinson West Little League, Inc., and its administrators, was settled a week later. The players did not sue the coaches, and refused to sign a statement they saw as implying blame on the coaches. Court documents showed the coaches had no knowledge of cheating.

References

 
Little League World Series
Little League World Series
Little League World Series
Little League World Series